WEYI-TV (channel 25), branded on-air as NBC 25, is a television station licensed to Saginaw, Michigan, United States, serving northeastern Michigan as an affiliate of NBC. It is owned by Howard Stirk Holdings, which maintains a shared services agreement (SSA) with Sinclair Broadcast Group, owner of Flint-licensed Fox affiliate WSMH (channel 66), for the provision of certain services. Sinclair also operates Bay City-licensed CW affiliate WBSF (channel 46) under a separate SSA with owner Cunningham Broadcasting. The three stations share studios on West Pierson Road in Mount Morris Township (with a Flint mailing address); WEYI-TV's transmitter is located at its former studios on West Willard Road in Vienna Township along the Genesee–Saginaw county line (with a Clio mailing address).

History
Channel 25 is one of the nation's oldest UHF stations. It debuted on April 5, 1953 as WKNX-TV on channel 57. It was owned by Lake Huron Broadcasting along with WKNX radio (AM 1210, now WJMK at AM 1250), and was a CBS affiliate. It also shared ABC with DuMont affiliate WTAC-TV and then-NBC affiliate WNEM-TV (which later became sister to the former WKNX radio). The station first operated from studios located on South Washington Avenue in Downtown Saginaw. When WTAC-TV shut down in 1954, WKNX-TV and WNEM-TV shared ABC until WJRT-TV signed on in 1958. It moved to the stronger channel 25 on September 14, 1965. The station later relocated its studios to a new facility located on State Street in Saginaw.

On March 23, 1972, Lake Huron Broadcasting sold the station to Rust Craft Broadcasting, who changed the call letters to the current WEYI-TV. Soon afterward, the station moved to its current tower and (now former) studios on West Willard Road in Vienna Township. The new tower significantly improved channel 25's coverage in Flint while still being within  of Saginaw as required by Federal Communications Commission (FCC) regulations. Prior to 1972, the southern side of the Flint/Saginaw/Bay City market, including Flint itself, got a better signal from Lansing's WJIM-TV (now WLNS-TV). Rust Craft merged with magazine publisher Ziff-Davis in 1979. The WKNX callsign is currently being used by an independent station in Knoxville, Tennessee.

Ziff-Davis sold WEYI along with sister stations WRDW-TV in Augusta, Georgia, WROC-TV in Rochester, New York and WTOV-TV in Steubenville, Ohio to Television Station Partners in 1983. As a CBS affiliate, WEYI dropped the CBS soap Guiding Light in the fall of 1987, instead showing cartoons during the 3–4 p.m. hour.

On January 16, 1995, WEYI and WNEM-TV traded network affiliations, resulting in WEYI becoming an NBC station. This came as part of the larger U.S. television network affiliate switches of 1994 that saw CBS' longtime affiliate in adjacent Detroit, WJBK, switch to Fox. CBS was having trouble getting a replacement affiliate in Detroit after it failed to affiliate with WXYZ-TV (which renewed its affiliation with ABC as part of a deal that caused three other stations to switch to the network) and WXON-TV (WDIV was not an option as that station was in the middle of a long-term affiliation contract with NBC, and neither was former Fox outlet WKBD-TV due to its owner Paramount Stations Group making it a UPN charter affiliate); it ultimately landed on WGPR-TV (channel 62, now WWJ-TV), which at the time broadcast at very low power and was practically unviewable outside Detroit's inner ring. Since WNEM's VHF signal penetrated further into Detroit's outer suburbs than WEYI's UHF signal, CBS persuaded WNEM's owner, Meredith Corporation, to switch to CBS. It is one of the few known instances during this period where CBS moved its affiliation from a UHF station to a VHF station. The last CBS program to air on WEYI was the CBS Sunday Night Movie presentation of Presumed Innocent on January 15, 1995 at 9:00 p.m., while the next day, the first NBC program to air was Today at 7:00 a.m. Eastern Time.

Television Station Partners sold WEYI along with WROC and WTOV to Smith Broadcasting in 1996. On January 16, 1997, the WEYI license was transferred to Smith Broadcasting subsidiary Sunrise Television. From October 4, 1999, to September 2001, the station added The WB as a secondary affiliation, airing its programming overnight.

In January 2002, Sunrise and LIN TV agreed that LIN would take over the station under a Local Marketing Agreement. By March, Sunrise sold the station to LIN with FCC approval granted in April 2002. LIN agreed to sell WEYI to Barrington Broadcasting in January 2004; the sale was approved by the FCC in March 2004.

In 2004, three years after WEYI ended its secondary WB affiliation, Barrington Broadcasting launched WB affiliate WBSF in the same market which was offered over-the-air on WEYI-DT2 and cable. The deal was made primarily because WKBD declined to carry Detroit Pistons basketball after the games switched to WDWB which is not available on most Mid-Michigan cable systems.

WEYI was blamed for forcing competing NBC affiliate WDIV from Detroit off of Comcast's Flint system, as well as starting the syndication exclusivity controversy on Comcast Flint. For several years, WDIV was available on Comcast's Flint system. However, in 2004, WEYI filed a complaint with the FCC claiming it was losing NBC viewers to WDIV, most likely due to that station's new digital, all-high definition picture. According to WEYI's website, the station used Betacam equipment (an analog videotape technology introduced in 1982) and none of its local or syndicated programming was broadcast in HD until 2014. This is because WEYI lacked an HD-capable master control to receive such programming in even 16:9 standard-definition widescreen, let alone HD. The FCC ruled in favor of WEYI and for a brief period, NBC programs on WDIV were blacked out on Comcast Flint. Eventually in August 2006, Comcast Flint removed WDIV from the system completely, replacing it with the new local MyNetworkTV affiliate via WNEM-TV's second digital subchannel.

On February 28, 2013, Barrington announced that it would sell its entire group, including WEYI and WBSF, to Sinclair Broadcast Group. However, due to FCC duopoly regulations, since Sinclair already owns Fox affiliate WSMH, Sinclair transferred the license assets of WEYI to Howard Stirk Holdings (owned by founder and CEO of communications firm The Graham Williams Group, political commentator Armstrong Williams, whose Sunday morning talk show The Right Side is carried by WEYI) and of WBSF to Cunningham Broadcasting (WSMH took over the operations of both WEYI and WBSF through local marketing agreements when the deal was completed). The sale was completed on November 25.

Programming
Syndicated programming on WEYI-TV includes Tamron Hall, The Kelly Clarkson Show, The Jennifer Hudson Show, Entertainment Tonight, and Inside Edition. WEYI is one of a few NBC affiliates to carry paid programming on weekdays.

As Channel 57 WKNX, the station had a localized franchised version of Romper Room with "Miss Carol" J. Hermance Kennedy as the host. Miss Carol started as host in 1956.

News operation
As of December 2021, WEYI presently broadcasts 22 hours of locally produced newscasts each week (with six hours each weekday, and an hour each on Saturdays and Sundays).
 
Effective April 27, 2015, WEYI took over duties of producing the 10 p.m. newscast for sister Sinclair station WSMH, FOX66 News at 10. Prior to April 27, WNEM-TV produced WSMH's evening newscast as part of a local agreement with WSMH.

Notable former on-air staff
Jim Brandstatter – sportscaster (1972–1975; now radio play-by-play announcer for Michigan Wolverines football)
Art James – on-camera host (later game show host, deceased)
Joe Pagliarulo – anchor (1994–1996), now a conservative radio personality known as "Joe Pags"
Ginger Zee – meteorologist (now ABC News/Good Morning America chief meteorologist)

Technical information

Subchannels
The station's digital signal is multiplexed:

On April 16, 2012, the station began an affiliation with the Bounce TV network on its .3 digital channel.

On September 9, 2019, WEYI launched Dabl on its .4 subchannel.

Analog-to-digital conversion 
WEYI-TV discontinued regular programming on its analog signal, over UHF channel 25, on June 12, 2009, the official date in which full-power television stations in the United States transitioned from analog to digital broadcasts under federal mandate. The station's digital signal remained on its pre-transition UHF channel 30, using PSIP to display the station's virtual channel as its former UHF analog channel 25. Also, WBSF became available on a separate digital signal on channel 46.

References

External links

NBC network affiliates
TBD (TV network) affiliates
Sinclair Broadcast Group
Television channels and stations established in 1953
EYI-TV
1953 establishments in Michigan
Dabl affiliates